"Don't Stop the Dance" is a song by English singer Bryan Ferry from his sixth solo studio album, Boys and Girls (1985). It was released as the album's second single. The track was written and produced by Ferry and Rhett Davies. It made the top 20 of Billboards Album Rock play list and reached number 26 on the Adult Contemporary chart.

An accompanying music video for "Don't Stop the Dance" was directed by John Scarlett Davis and featured the French model Laurence Treil.

The track has been remixed by several DJs.

Promotional video

The music video begins with various shots of theater lights, and then cuts to Laurence Treil's hips as she dances. The film shows scenes of her silhouette, then Ferry's face as he sings. Segments of old film of people dancing play behind both as the video continues, including women on the beach, chorus girls, ballet dancers, tap dancers and others. Treil seems to play a saxophone during David Sanborn's sax solo portion of the song.

One version of the video shows nude women on the beach, but a different edition shows women in 1920s bathing costumes. Stylization for the video was completed by fashion photographer Stevie Hughes.

Remixes
In 2013 all-new remixes of "Don't Stop the Dance" were released, on three limited edition 12" vinyl, and as downloads. Remixers were Eric "Dunks" Duncan, Grasshopper, Greg Wilson & Derek Kaye, Idjut Boys, Punks Jump Up, Psychemagik, Sleazy McQueen, Space Coast and Todd Terje.

Charts

References

External links
 Promotional video from YouTube

1985 singles
1985 songs
Bryan Ferry songs
Songs written by Bryan Ferry
Sophisti-pop songs